Perry Ferguson (November 13, 1901 – December 27, 1963) was an American art director. He was nominated for five Academy Awards in the category Best Art Direction. He was born in Texas and died in Los Angeles, California.

Selected filmography
Ferguson was nominated for five Academy Awards for Best Art Direction:
 Winterset (1936)
 Citizen Kane (1941)
 The Pride of the Yankees (1942)
 The North Star (1943)
 Casanova Brown (1944)

References

External links

1901 births
1963 deaths
American art directors
People from Fort Worth, Texas